The Shula Bowl is the name given to the Florida Atlantic–Florida International football rivalry. It is an annual college football rivalry game between the only two public universities in the Miami metropolitan area: Florida Atlantic University in Boca Raton and Florida International University in University Park. The game's winner receives a traveling trophy, the "Don Shula Award," for one year. The current winner is Florida Atlantic, winning 52–7 on November 12, 2022. Florida Atlantic leads the all-time series sixteen games to four.

The game and trophy are named after former Miami Dolphins head coach Don Shula. Don Shula was the head coach of the Miami Dolphins from 1970 to 1995. Each school's first head coach has previous ties to Don Shula. Florida Atlantic's first head coach Howard Schnellenberger was an assistant of Shula in the 1970s, and FIU's first head coach Don Strock was a player under Shula in the 1970s and 1980s. Don Shula set numerous records as head coach of the Miami Dolphins and his legacy is seen throughout the Miami area. The Shula Bowl pays homage to Shula, to South Florida football and the ties and history of both universities.

Game location
The Shula Bowl was first played at Hard Rock Stadium, then known as Pro Player Stadium, in present-day Miami Gardens, Florida on November 23, 2002. The game now alternates between Florida Atlantic and FIU's home fields. Until 2010, Florida Atlantic used Pro Player Stadium (later renamed Dolphin Stadium in 2006) as their home field, where FIU has almost always used FIU Stadium on the FIU campus as its home field. On one occasion, in 2007, FIU used the Miami Orange Bowl in Little Havana, Miami as its home field, while FIU Stadium was undergoing an expansion. The 2007 game was played in the final months of the Orange Bowl before being demolished for the construction of Marlins Park. Beginning in 2012, Florida Atlantic used its newly built FAU Stadium in Boca Raton as its home field, marking the first time the Shula Bowl was played on both rival schools' campuses.

Television
For years the game was telecast on the ESPN family of networks through an agreement to broadcast games in the Sun Belt Conference. In 2013, both schools moved to Conference USA, and the game was instead aired on Fox Sports 1, as C-USA did not air games on the ESPN networks (save for the conference championship game). In recent years the game has aired on Stadium and is carried locally on WSFL-TV The CW South Florida.

Future
It was announced in 2021 that FAU was set to leave Conference USA for the American Athletic Conference beginning in the 2023–24 school year, making it unclear whether the rivalry series would continue in the current format. It was presumed that football in particular would be on hiatus until at least 2024, because that would be the next year when both teams would have openings in their non-conference schedules.

In a statement announced on September 26, 2022, the FAU and FIU athletics departments inked a four-game series that would continue the Shula Bowl beginning in 2024.

Game results

References

Florida Atlantic Owls football
FIU Panthers football
2002 establishments in Florida
Sports rivalries in Florida